Limestone Run is a  stream that lies to the east of New Creek Mountain in Mineral County, West Virginia. It is a tributary of the North Branch Potomac River.

See also
Twin Mountain and Potomac Railroad
List of rivers of West Virginia

References

Rivers of Mineral County, West Virginia
Rivers of West Virginia
Tributaries of the Potomac River